In nature worship, a nature deity is a deity in charge of forces of nature, such as a water deity, vegetation deity, sky deity, solar deity, fire deity, or any other naturally occurring phenomena such as mountains, trees, or volcanoes. Accepted in panentheism, pantheism, deism, polytheism, animism, totemism, shamanism, and paganism, the deity embodies natural forces and can have various characteristics, such as that of a mother goddess, "Mother Nature", or lord of the animals.

African mythology

 Asase Yaa, the goddess of the harsh earth, Truth and Mother of the Dead in the Akan religion
 Asase Afua, the Goddess of the lush earth, fertility, love, procreation and farming in the Akan religion
 Bia (Bea), God of the wilderness and wild animals in the Akan religion

 Aja, Yoruba orisha, patron of the forest, the animals within it and herbal healers
 iNyanga, Zulu, moon goddess
 Nomhoyi, Zulu, goddess of rivers
 Nomkhubulwane, Zulu, goddess mother of fertility, rain, agriculture, rainbow and beer
 Oko, Yoruba orisha, patron of new harvest of the white African yam and of hunting.
 Oshosi, Yoruba orisha, patron of the forest and of hunting.
 Osanyin, Yoruba orisha, patron of the forest, herbs and healing.
 Unsondo, Zulu, god of the sky, sun, thunder, earthquake

Egyptian mythology
 Ash, god of the oasis and the vineyards of the western Nile Delta
 Geb, Egyptian god of earth with sister/wife Nut, the sky goddess as his consort. He is regarded as the father of Osiris, Isis, Set, Nephthys, and in some cases, Horus.

American

Aztec mythology
 Xochipilli, god of art, games, beauty, dance, flowers, maize, and song
 Xochiquetzal, goddess of fertility, beauty, female sexual power, protection of young mothers, of pregnancy, childbirth, vegetation, flowers, and the crafts of women
 Tonantzin, mother goddess

Inca mythology
 Pachamama, fertility goddess who presides over planting, harvesting and earthquakes

Maya mythology
 Yum Kaax, god of agriculture, wild plants and animals

Native American mythology
 Asintmah, Athabaskan earth and nature goddess, and the first woman to walk the earth
 Ngen, Mapuche spirits of nature

Vodou
 Baron Samedi, loa of the dead
 Grand Bois, loa associated with trees, plants and herbs
 L'inglesou, loa who lives in the wild areas of Haiti and kills anyone who offends him
 Loco, loa associated with healers and plants, especially trees

Asian

Arab mythology
 Dhat-Badan, Ethiopian and Yemeni goddess of the oasis

Chinese mythology
 Dou Mu Niang Niang, Mother Goddess of the Big Dipper
 Tai Sui, Star Deities of sixty years cycle
 Chang'e, moon goddess
 Lei Gong, god of thunder
 Hou Tu Niang Niang, Mother Earth and Overlord of all Tu Di Gong
 Tu Di Gong, earth deity of a specific locality and nearby human communities
 Gonggong, ancient god of water
 Zhurong, ancient god of fire
 Hebo, god of Yellow River
 San Shan Guo Wang, lords of the Three Mountains in Southern China

Hinduism
Prithvi or Bhumi, goddess regarded as "Mother Earth"; Sanskrit for Earth
Agni, god of fire
Varuna, god of oceans
Vayu, god of wind
Indra, god of rain, lightning and thunders
Aranyani, goddess of the forests and the animals that dwell within it

Hittite mythology
 Irpitiga, lord of the earth
 Sarruma, god of the mountains

Japanese mythology
 Amaterasu, goddess of the sun
 Izanagi, forefather of the gods, god of creation and life and first male
 Izanami, Izanagi's wife and sister, goddess of creation and death, first female
 Konohanasakuya-hime, the blossom-princess and symbol of delicate earthly life
 Shinigami, god of death
 Suijin, god of water
 Fūjin, god of wind
 Kagu-tsuchi, god of fire
 Susanoo, god of storms, (fertility in Izumo legends), younger brother to Amaterasu and Tsukuyomi
 Tsukuyomi, god of the moon and oceans, younger brother of Amaterasu and older brother of Susanoo

Korean mythology
 Dangun, god-king of Gojoseon, god of the mountain
 Dokkaebi, nature spirits
 Lady Saso, goddess of the mountain
 Jacheongbi, goddess of the grain, agriculture, harvest, growth, and nourishment
 Jeonggyun Moju, mother of Suro of Geumgwan Gaya and Ijinashi of Daegaya, goddess of the mountain
 Jik, god of grains
 Sa, god of the earth
 Sansin, local mountain gods

Mesopotamian mythology
 Abu, minor Sumerian god of plants
 Damu, a vegetation god
 Emesh, Sumerian god of vegetation
 Kishar, goddess representing the earth
 Ningishzida, a vegetation god
 Ninhursag, Sumerian mother goddess associated with the earth and fertility
 Ningikuga, Sumerian goddess of reeds and marshes
 Ua-Ildak, Babylonian and Akkadian goddess responsible for pastures and poplar trees

Persian mythology
 Spenta Armaiti, goddess of earth
 Ameretat, goddess of vegetation
 Haurvatat, goddess associated with water
 Anahita, goddess of waters
 Tishtrya, god of rain and lightning
 Apam Napat, god of waters

Turco-Mongol
 Umay, the goddess of nature, love and fertility in Turkic mythology. Also known as Yer Ana.
 İye, deities or spirits or natural assets.
Baianai, the god of the forest, animals, and hunt in Turkic mythology.
Ukulan, the god of water in Turkic mythology, also known as Su Ata.

Vietnamese mythology
 Ông Trời, god of the heaven/sky and king of the gods
 Mẫu Thượng Thiên, goddess of the heavens/skys
 Thiên Y A Na, the goddess has the same job as the Mẫu Thượng Thiên
 Mẫu Thượng Ngàn, goddess of the mountains and forests
 Tản Viên Sơn Thánh, god of Ba Vì mountain range
 Mẫu Thoải, the goddess who governs all things related to water
 Mẫu Địa, goddess of the earth
 Lạc Long Quân, one of the Long Vươngs at the head of the Water Palace
 Bà Hỏa, goddess of fire
 Bà Thủy, goddess of water, rivers and estuaries
 Hà Bá, the god who manages the rivers (note that each river has its own governing god, and each person's power may be less or more powerful than Hà Bá)
 Thổ Công, is the earth god who governs the land, each house; each piece of land will have its own Thổ Công
 Thiên Lôi, god of thunder
 Tứ Pháp, group of four goddess sisters including clouds, rain, thunder and lightning

European

Armenian mythology
 Ara the Handsome, in the myth of Ara the Beautiful and Semiramis Ara acts as a deity of a dying and resurrecting nature
 Aralez (mythology) Aralezner, the oldest gods in the Armenian pantheon, Aralez are dog-like creatures with powers to resuscitate fallen warriors and resurrect the dead by licking wounds clean
 Areg (Arev) or Ar, god of the Sun, comparable with Mesopotamian Utu. Likely also known as, or developed into, Ara. This god was probably mentioned on the Urartian-era Door of Meher (as Ara or Arwaa)
 Astłik had been worshipped as the Armenian deity of fertility and love, later the skylight had been considered her personification 
 Ayg, goddess of the dawn.
 Amanor, "The bearer of new fruits" (the god of the new year, Navasard). May or may not have been the same god as Vanatur.
 Andndayin ōj, "the Abyssal Serpent" that lived in the black waters surrounding the world tree
 Barsamin  god of sky and weather
 Tsovinar "Nar of the Sea", goddess of waters and the ocean. Perhaps also a lightning goddess. Became the consort of Vahagn. Possibly connected to Inara, in Hittite–Hurrian mythology the goddess of the wild animals of the steppe and daughter of the Storm-god Teshub
 Mihr (Armenian deity) cognate with the Mithra. God of the sun and light, son of Aramazd, the brother of Anahit and Nane.
 Spandaramet  a daughter of Aramazd, and chthonic goddess of fertility, vineyards and the underworld
 Shahapet, also called Khshathrapti, Shavod, Shoithrapaiti, Shvaz and Shvod, were usually friendly guardian spirits of Armenian mythology, who typically appeared in the form of serpents. They inhabited houses, forests and graveyards. The Shvaz type was more agriculturally oriented, while the Shvod was a guardian of the home.
 Nhang, was a river-dwelling serpent-monster with shape shifting powers, often connected to the more conventional Armenian dragons. The word "Nhang" is sometimes used as a generic term for a sea-monster in ancient Armenian literature.
 Piatek is a large mammalian creature similar to a wingless griffin.
 Vishap a dragon closely associated with water, similar to the Leviathan. It is usually depicted as a winged snake or with a combination of elements from different animals.

Baltic mythology
 Medeina, Lithuanian goddess of forests, trees, and animals
 Zemes māte, goddess of the earth

Celtic mythology
 Abnoba, Gaulish goddess associated with forests and rivers
 Artio, Gaulish bear goddess of the wilderness
 Arduinna, goddess of the Ardennes forest region, represented as a huntress
 Cernunnos, horned god associated with horned male animals, produce, and fertility
 Druantia, hypothetical Gallic tree goddess proposed by Robert Graves in his 1948 study The White Goddess; popular with Neopagans. 
 Nantosuelta, Gaulish goddess of nature, the earth, fire, and fertility
 Sucellus, god of agriculture, forests, and alcoholic drinks
 Viridios, god of vegetation, rebirth, and agriculture, possibly cognate with the Green Man
Karærin, Celtic goddess who protects animals and nature
Sínann, Irish goddess, embodiment of the River Shannon, the longest river on Ireland, also a goddess of wisdom.

English mythology
 Apple Tree Man, the spirit of the oldest apple tree in an orchard, from the cider-producing region of Somerset.
 Churnmilk Peg, female guardian spirit of unripe nut thickets. She prevents them from being gathered by naughty children before they can be harvested. Melsh Dick is her male counterpart and performs the same function. Respectively, they derive from the traditions of West Yorkshire and Northern England.

Etruscan mythology
 Fufluns, god of plant life, happiness, wine, health, and growth in all things
 Selvans, god of the woodlands
 Artumes, goddess of the hunt, woodlands, the night, and the wild

Finnish mythology
 Lempo, god of wilderness and archery
 Tapio, god and ruler of forests
 Mielikki, goddess of forests and the hunt. Wife of Tapio.

Mari
 Mlande, god of the earth
 Mlande-Ava, goddess of the earth

Georgian mythology
 Dali, goddess of mountain animals such as ibex and deer

Germanic mythology
 Ēostre or Ostara, the goddess of spring
 Nerthus, goddess of the earth, called by the Romans Terra Mater.

Greek mythology
 Actaeon, god of the wilderness, wild animals, the hunt, and male animals
 Anthousai, flower nymphs
 Aphrodite, goddess of love, beauty, pleasure, fertility, and flowers
 Apollo, god of the sun, light, healing, poetry and music, and archery
 Aristaeus, god of shepherds, cheesemaking, beekeeping, honey, honey-mead, olive growing, oil milling, medicinal herbs, hunting, and the Etesian winds 
 Artemis, goddess of the hunt, the dark, the light, the moon, wild animals, nature, wilderness, childbirth, virginity, fertility, young girls, and health and plague in women and childhood
 Aurae, nymphs of the breezes
 Chloris, goddess of flowers
 Cronus, titan of time and harvest
 Cybele, Phrygian goddess of the fertile earth and wild animals
 Demeter, goddess of the harvest, crops, the fertility of the earth, grains, and the seasons
 Dionysus, god of wine, vegetation, pleasure, madness, and festivity. The Roman equivalent is Bacchus.
 Dryads, tree and forest nymphs
 Epimeliades, nymphs of highland pastures and protectors of sheep flocks
 Gaia, the goddess of the earth and its personification. She is also the primal mother goddess.
 Hamadryades, oak tree dryades
 Hegemone, goddess of plants, specifically making them bloom and bear fruit as they were supposed to
 Helios, Titan-god of the Sun
 Hermes, originally a nature deity 
 Horae, goddesses of the seasons and the natural portions of time
 Meliae, nymphs of honey and the ash tree
 Nymphs, nature spirits
 Naiades, fresh water nymphs
 Nereids, salt-water nymphs
 Nyx, Primordial goddess and personification of Night
 Oceanides, fresh water nymphs
 Oreades, mountain nymphs
 Oxylus, god of forests & mountains 
 Pan, god of shepherds, flocks, mountain wilds, and rustic music
 Persephone (Kore), goddess of spring growth
 Physis, primeval goddess of nature
 Rhea, goddess of fertility, motherhood, and the mountain wilds
 Satyrs, rustic nature spirits
 Selene, Titan-goddess of the Moon

Greek rustic deities

Norse mythology
 Jörð, personification of the earth. She is the Icelandic version of Fjörgyn, and the mother of Thor
 Iðunn the goddess of spring who guarded the apples that kept the gods eternally young; wife of the god Bragi
 Fjörgyn, the female personification of the earth. She is also the mother of the goddess Frigg and, very rarely, mother of Thor
 Freyja, goddess of fertility, gold, death, love, beauty, war and magic
 Freyr, god of fertility, rain, sunlight, life and summer
 Skadi, goddess of mountains, skiing, winter, archery and hunting
 Sif, goddess of earth, fertility, and the harvest
 Thor, god of thunder, lightning, weather, oak trees, and fertility
 Ullr, god of hunting, archery, skiing, and mountains
 Njord, god of the sea, fishing, and fertility
 Rán, goddess of the sea, storms, and death

Nordic folklore
 Rå, Skogsrå, Hulder, beautiful, female forest spirit, can lure men to their death by making them fall in love and marrying them
 Nøkken, male water spirit, lures foolish children into the lakes at the deepest, darkest parts of the lakes
 Elf, beautiful, fairy-like creature that lives in the forest and streams.

Roman mythology
 Bacchus - god of wine, nature, pleasure and festivity; equivalent to the Greek god Dionysus
 Ceres, goddess of growing plants and motherly relationships; equivalent to the Greek goddess Demeter
 Diana, goddess of the hunt, wild animals, wilderness and the moon; equivalent to the Greek goddess Artemis
 Faunus, horned god of the forest, plains and fields
 Feronia, goddess associated with wildlife, fertility, health and abundance
 Flora, goddess of flowers and the spring; equivalent to the Greek goddess Chloris
 Fufluns, god of plant life, happiness and health and growth in all things
 Liber, cognate for Bacchus/Dionysus
 Nemestrinus, god of the forests and woods
 Ops, goddess of fertility and the earth
 Pilumnus, nature god who ensured children grew properly and stayed healthy
 Pomona, goddess of fruit trees, gardens and orchards
 Silvanus, tutelary spirit or deity of woods and fields and protector of forests
 Terra, primeval goddess personifying the earth; equivalent to the Greek goddess Gaia

Slavic mythology
 Berstuk, evil Wendish god of the forest
 Jarilo, god of vegetation, fertility, spring, war and harvest
 Leshy, a tutelary deity of the forests.  
 Porewit, god of the woods, who protected lost voyagers and punished those who mistreated the forest
 Porvata, Polish god of the woods
 Siliniez, Polish god of the woods for whom moss was sacred
 Tawals, Polish blessing-bringing god of the meadows and fields
 Veles, god of earth, waters and the underworld
 Mokosh, East-Slavic goddess of nature

Oceanian

Māori mythology 
 Papatuanuku, the earth mother
 Ranginui, the sky father
 Ruaumoko, god of volcanoes and seasons
 Tāne, god of forests and of birds

Micronesian mythology
 Nei Tituaabine, Kiribati goddess of trees

Philippine mythology

 Amihan, Tagalog god of the monsoon
 Apúng Sinukuan (Maria Sinukuan), Kapampangan mountain goddess associated with Mount Arayat
 Dayang Masalanta (Maria Makiling), Tagalog mountain goddess associated with Mount Makiling
 Mayari (Bulan), goddess of the moon
 Kan-Laon, Visayan god of time associated with the volcano Kanlaon
 Tala, Tagalog goddess of the morning and evening star

Toraja
 Indo' Ongon-Ongon, goddess of earthquakes
 Pong Banggai di Rante, earth goddess

References

 
Nature